Eisa Davis (born May 5, 1971) is an American playwright, actress and singer-songwriter. She is most commonly known for her work as a playwright, writing shows such as Bulrusher and Angela's Mixtape as well as through her acting work, wherein she won an Obie Award for Sustained Excellence in Performance. She resides in Brooklyn.

Early life and education 
Davis spent her childhood in San Francisco, California. As a child, she spent her time attending dance classes and learning the piano. She is the niece of political activist Angela Davis. After graduating from Berkeley High School, she earned a bachelor's degree from Harvard University and a Master of Fine Arts from the Actors Studio, where she double majored in playwriting and acting. Her dance skills are notable as well, with the dean of her program saying she could have been admitted to Alvin Ailey.

Career 

Davis stars as Addie Pickett, nurse and receptionist at Bluebell, Alabama's local medical practice in The CW's series Hart of Dixie, a fish-out-of-water story about a New York City doctor (Rachel Bilson) adjusting to life in a small Southern town after she inherits a local medical practice. In 2006 Davis was nominated for, and subsequently won, an Obie Award for her performance in Passing Strange. The show premiered at Berkeley Rep, but then moved on to Broadway and Davis went with the show, only later to have the whole production filmed by Spike Lee. In 2009 she wrote and starred in Angela's Mixtapes. The show was autobiographical and went on to make it into the New Yorkers list of best plays from that year. Davis was previously a resident playwright at New Dramatists, during which time she won two playwriting awards, the Whitfield Cook and the Helen Merrill. Recently she has worked at Williams College as an Arthur Levitt Fellow for the 2013/14 season. Currently she is the Symphony Space's artist-in-residence. Davis has two albums of her own music, Something Else and Tinctures. Some of her songs have been featured on the Showtime series Soul Food. Davis also narrated the role of Celestial Davenport Hamilton in the audiobook version of An American Marriage by Tayari Jones.

Artistic philosophy 
Davis believes in the Ghanaian principle of Sankofa. The literal translation of the word is "return and collect it" or "go back and get it". This refers to her use of digging through her own lineage and history to find action and themes that can be used in her plays. She also uses her art to answer questions that "haunt" her or ideas that she is grappling with herself. Much of her artistic philosophy can be summed up in her quote, "Theatre is one of the few public spaces we have for active contemplation." She struggles with ideas such as blackness and family through the poetry of her language.

Filmography

Film

Television

Awards

References

External links

1971 births
20th-century African-American people
21st-century African-American people
African-American dramatists and playwrights
American opera librettists
Harvard University alumni
Living people
People from Berkeley, California
Place of birth missing (living people)
Women opera librettists